Harriet Cains (born 17 September 1993) is an English actress. She is best known for her role as Jem Walker in the BBC Three series In the Flesh and Philipa Featherington in Netflix's historical romance drama Bridgerton.

Early life and education
Cains is from Nottingham. She took acting classes at a drama club called Circle Up for three years before going on to train at the Television Workshop.

Career
During her time with the Television Workshop, Cains was cast in short films roles as well as Hollyoaks Later. She became aware of auditions in Manchester for the series In the Flesh and she was cast as Jem Walker. To prepare for the role, Cains watched documentaries about post-traumatic stress disorder and anxiety while also talking to people with experience to portray them in a realistic manner.

In 2015, Cains was cast as Louisa Blackwell in Safe House. Since 2016, she has appeared in various supporting roles, including Lizzie Hallum for the crime series Vera and Jade Hopkirk in Line of Duty in early 2017.

At the beginning of July 2017, it was announced that Cains would become a series regular in the second season of the ITV/Netflix series Marcella, as single mum Gail Donovan. The second series began airing in February 2018, with Cains appearing in six episodes.

Cains was a contributing performer of all-female comedy collective Major Labia until 2017.

In 2019, Cains was as cast as Philippa Featherington in the 2020 Shondaland and Netflix period drama Bridgerton, based on the books by Julia Quinn.

Filmography

Film

Television

References

External links

Living people
1993 births
21st-century English actresses
Actors from Nottingham